Frederik Jensen (25 June 1863 – 14 February 1934) was a Danish stage and film actor.

He was involved in stage throughout much of his career, appearing in films during his final years.

Selected filmography
En lille bitte mand (1909)
København ved Nat (1910)
Under kjærlighedens aak (1916)
Her Secret (1919)
David Copperfield (1922)
Lille Dorrit (1923)
Hesten (1931)
Hesten (1931)
Skal vi vædde en million? (1932)
Tretten år (1932)
Fem raske piger (1933)
Nyhavn 17 (1933)
Den ny husassistent (1933)

References and External links

Danish male stage actors
Danish male film actors
Danish male silent film actors
20th-century Danish male actors
People from Nyborg
1863 births
1934 deaths
Place of death missing